The Atiq Mosque (also called the Great Mosque, or al-Kabir mosque) is a mosque in the oasis village of Awjila, in the Sahara desert of the Cyrenaica region of eastern Libya. The community dates back to classical times. Since being taken by the Arabs in the seventh century, Islam has always played a central role in the life of Awjila. The 12th-century mosque, the oldest in the region, has unusual conical domes made of mudbrick and limestone that provide light and ventilation.

Location

Awjila and the adjoining oasis of Jalu are isolated, the only towns on the desert highway between Ajdabiya,  to the northwest, and Kufra,  to the southeast.
The oasis produces high quality dates.
The people of the oasis are mainly Berber, and some still speak a Berber-origin language.
As of 2005 the Awjila language was highly endangered.
The mosque is located in the old city area of Awjila.

History

The Arabs launched a campaign against the Byzantine Empire soon after Muhammad died in 632, quickly conquering Syria, Persia and Egypt. After occupying Alexandria in 643, they swept along the Mediterranean coast of Africa, taking Cyrenaica in 644, Tripolitania in 646 and Fezzan in 663.
The region around Awjila was conquered by Sidi 'Abdullāh ibn Sa'ad ibn Abī as-Sarḥ.
His tomb was established in Awjila around 650.

After being introduced in the seventh century, Islam has always been a major influence on the life of the oasis.
The Arab chronicler Al-Bakri says that there were already several mosques around the oasis by the 11th century.
Starting in the 1960s, the oil industry drove growth in the once-sleepy village.
By 1968, the population of the village had increased to about 2,000 people, and by 1982 it had risen to over 4,000, supported by twelve mosques.

Structure
The Great Mosque of Atiq is the oldest mosque in the region.
The present building dates to the 12th century.
It was restored in the 1980s.
The oasis was a destination for viewing the Solar eclipse of 29 March 2006, and the mosque was again refurbished in preparation for the visitors.

There is a palm tree post on each side of the entrance gate to the mosque enclosure.
Each dome has small openings so that light can enter the building.
The domes also serve to keep the interior cool, providing a form of natural air conditioning.

Nine doors lead into the interior of the building, where the many pillars and arches create a spacious, light, cool and calm environment.
Beside the mihrab there is a recessed niche for the minbar, where the prayer leader stands.
Mosques in Arabia and East Africa have similar minbar niches, which may indicate that the mosque builders followed the Ibadi school of Islam.

See also
 Islam in Libya
 List of mosques in Libya

References
Notes

Citations

Sources

Mosques in Libya
Al Wahat District
12th-century mosques